Mary Elizabeth Kane, better known as Bette Kane, is a superheroine appearing in American comic books published by DC Comics. The character first appeared in the 1960s as "Betty Kane", the Bat-Girl. Her name was later modified to "Bette Kane", and she assumed the role of Flamebird.

Fictional character biography

Pre-Crisis

The original Bat-Girl first appeared in Batman #139 (April 1961) as Betty Kane, the niece of Kathy Kane, also known as Batwoman. After discovering her aunt's dual identity, Betty convinced Batwoman to train her as her sidekick.

Batwoman and Bat-Girl were created to be romantic interests for Batman and Robin, respectively, as well as crime-fighting associates. Bat-Girl appeared seven times between 1961 and 1964, but then disappeared in 1964 (along with Batwoman, Ace the Bat-Hound, Bat-Mite, Vicki Vale and (temporarily) Alfred) when the new Batman editor, Julius Schwartz, decided she and other characters did not fit the new direction he intended to take the series. It has been suggested by scholars that the characters of Batwoman (in 1956) and Bat-Girl (in 1961) were introduced in part to refute allegations of homosexuality in Batman comics; specifically, the enduring claim that Batman and Robin were homosexuals.

Later in the 1970s Batwoman and Bat-Girl were revived and were regarded to have been inactive for several years. Bat-Girl became a member of the Teen Titans West in Teen Titans #50 (October 1977). However, the original Teen Titans series was cancelled with issue #53 (February 1978) and the Teen Titans, including Teen Titans West, were disbanded. After this, Bat-Girl only appeared two more times during this era; a guest appearance in Batman Family #16 (March 1978), and as one of the attendees at Donna Troy and Terry Long's wedding in Tales of the Teen Titans #50 (February 1985).

Post-Crisis
In the post-Crisis DC Universe, the character known as Batwoman was erased from existence (although her alter ego, Kathy Kane, was revealed to have existed and was murdered by the League of Assassins). Batwoman's niece, Betty Kane, disappeared as well. Unlike her aunt, Betty's removal from history would not last long.

For a brief time in the 1970s, Betty had joined the west coast version of the Teen Titans under her Bat-Girl moniker. Though "Bat-Girl" does not exist in the post-Crisis universe, her team did; therefore, a new version of the character was necessary. In Secret Origins Annual #3 (1989), the official post-Crisis history of Titans West was revealed. Instead of Betty Kane's Bat-Girl, fans were introduced to a similar character called Mary Elizabeth "Bette" Kane, also known as Flamebird. This was an in-joke, as the team of "Nightwing and Flamebird" had a history in the Silver Age continuity as a pair of supporting characters in the Superman books.

Bette was now a very driven and somewhat spoiled Los Angeles debutante and tennis prodigy. After seeing Robin on the news, Bette vowed that she would gain his attention and favor by becoming a masked adventurer herself. Training to Olympic-levels in gymnastics and martial arts, she created the identity of Flamebird (and a costume that resembled her pre-Crisis Bat-Girl identity) and joined Titans West in hopes of catching Robin's eye. While flattered, the driven young hero was not sure how to deal with her obsession and avoided her, much to her dismay. After briefly giving up her heroic persona, Bette found that neither winning tennis tournaments nor achieving perfect grades in school matched the rooftop thrills of the hero biz. She attempted several times to reunite the Titans West team, most notably after a journey into the afterlife with Hawk and Dove, but was unsuccessful. Dove noted that Bette was essentially a very lonely person, basically desperate for company and contact with others. Bette again gave up her obsession with the Titans until malfunctioning former Titan Victor Stone collected her, along with all former Titans everywhere, in an attempt to protect his soul from the Justice League. Hoping this would lead to a formal invitation to rejoin the team, Bette was crushed to learn they did not need (or want) her assistance.

A short time later, Gar "Beast Boy" Logan found himself alone in Los Angeles after the team neglected to ask him back. Landing himself in a bit of trouble by an impostor framing him for various crimes, Gar asked former teammate Bette for help. Having been recently chastised for her dedication (or lack thereof) to crime-fighting by Robin (now in his adult Nightwing identity), Flamebird seized the opportunity to better herself and her reputation, becoming more level-headed and boosting her crime-fighting arsenal. However, the design of her outfit as an adult has similarities to that of Dick Grayson's Nightwing outfit, with a red tunic and gold V running across the chest. After Bette helped Gar clear his name, his cousin Matt attempted one last recruitment drive for Titans West (dubbing the ill-fated team Titans L.A.). None of the recruits took the event seriously except for insane and uninvited former Titan Duela Dent, who crashed the party and was subdued by Bette. Around the same time, she and Beast Boy both served on an ad hoc Young Justice team, which she hoped would raise their public profiles; however, the team only lasted for one mission. Content to remain a hero on her own, Bette was unheard from until she was captured by a Brainiac-worshipping cult leader in Oregon and eventually rescued by Oracle's covert team of female operatives in Birds of Prey. She fought Doctor Light alongside the majority of heroes who had once been members of the Teen Titans.

Infinite Crisis

Flamebird appeared in Infinite Crisis #4 to fight Superboy-Prime. In this storyline, it was indicated that Flamebird had originally been the Earth-Two counterpart to Bat-Girl, and that after the Crisis on Infinite Earths, Flamebird had replaced Bat-Girl on the sole remaining Earth. Flamebird, along with most of the Justice Society, disappeared when Earth-Two was reborn. In the Villains United special, Flamebird (and the other heroes who vanished to Earth-Two) had made it back to "New Earth" at some point after Infinite Crisis #6. She was among the many heroes gathered to fight off the invasion of Metropolis by the Society.Teen Titans vol. 3 #38 reveals that Flamebird briefly served on the Titans during the year-long gap.

Relationship to Batwoman

Following the events of Infinite Crisis, it is revealed that Bette is the cousin of current Batwoman, Kate Kane. In Detective Comics #856, Bette moves to Gotham City to enroll in Gotham University. She encounters her cousin at a party thrown for the Gotham City Police Department, and attempts to chat her up, only to be blown off. According to Kate's father, Bette looks up to her and likes spending time with her. In Detective Comics #862, Bette is seen hunched over on her bed, staring at her Flamebird costume and asking Kate how to "let go of the past". Bette is kidnapped by a crazed serial killer known as the Cutter, and awakens bound and gagged in his workshop. The Cutter plans on removing Bette's ears as part of a plan to create a perfect woman through the use of stolen body parts. Batwoman rescues Bette from the killer and accidentally reveals her identity. At the end of the story, Bette is seen in her Flamebird outfit, telling Kate that she wants to become her new partner. Kate eventually agrees to train Bette, and gives her a capeless grey military outfit and the codename Plebe. Later still, Bette acquires pyrotechnic technology and adopts the codename Hawkfire. As Hawkfire, she tries to rescue cousin Beth Kane from the clutches of the Department of Extranormal Operations, but is herself captured.

A Bat-Girl looking similar to Betty Kane is revealed to have existed in the past in Batman #682, and later reappears in Batman, Inc. #4 (April 2011). As in pre-Crisis continuity, she is the younger protege of the first Batwoman, Kathy Kane (who reappears in post-Infinite Crisis continuity as the original Batwoman, but with a revamped origin). It has not yet been confirmed if Bette Kane used the Bat-Girl identity in her younger years prior to becoming Flamebird or if Bat-Girl is a completely separate character.

DC Rebirth
In the DC Rebirth relaunch, Bette has enrolled at the United States Military Academy, seeming to be a yearling, or sophomore, cadet. She keeps in contact with Kate Kane and Julia Pennyworth, and even briefly visits Kate in Gotham.

Powers and abilities
Flamebird is an exceptional athlete, trained for strength and endurance, and has worked as a professional tennis player. She has also trained in several forms of martial arts, with kickboxing as her specialty. As such, while she is a formidable martial arts opponent and combatant, she is not among the top tier or elite of DC's martial artists.

Like Robin, Flamebird has a utility belt containing a grappling hook with line, gas grenades, gas mask, flares, flashlight, radio/transmitter, handcuffs, bird-shaped throwing blades (Bird-A-Rangs), and an emergency medical kit. She increased her arsenal by equipping her mask with lenses capable of emitting powerful bursts of blinding light, and created bird-like bolas that can electrocute anyone tangled in them.

As Plebe, Batwoman's sidekick, Bette is stripped of her outfit and gadgetry, wearing a nondescript grey military outfit. Her martial arts prowess however is being improved by Batwoman's tutelage. Later, as Hawkfire, her costume features gold plated elements and she carries a wrist-mounted flamethrowing device.

Since enrolling at West Point, she would have received the same sort of military training conducted there, which among other things would require instruction in firearms, boxing, Modern Army Combatives, and battlefield tactics.

Other versions

In Teen Titans Go! #24, the Titans get their powers swapped. When Starfire is given Robin's abilities, she finds herself wearing Bette's original Bat-Girl costume. In issue #50, Flamebird is officially introduced via a small screen on the Titans Tower computer, and she appears again in issue #55 as a member of Titans North, wearing a red T-shirt with a burning bird emblem, cargo pants, and yellow goggles.
In The All-New Batman: The Brave and the Bold #13, after the Robins manage to save Batman from death, Madame Xanadu shows Phantom Stranger a similar team of Batgirls, including Bette, Barbara Gordon, Stephanie Brown and Cassandra Cain. 
In part two of Neil Gaiman's Whatever Happened to the Caped Crusader?, Bette is seen in her Silver Age Bat-Girl costume describing a death of Batman. He was holding a bomb that would destroy Gotham if he released its switch or if the timer ran down. Batman then throws himself into the Gotham River with the bomb to prevent the explosion from causing any damage.
 In the alternate future storyline "Titans Tomorrow", it was revealed that after her death at the hands of Duela Dent, Batman (Tim Drake) used the Lazarus Pit to resurrect Flamebird, who assumed the alias of Batwoman and became his partner (and lover). But when he and the other Teen Titans began to take over the Western United States, Batwoman formed a Titans East team with the Titans who opposed their rule (Cyborg, Terra, Bumblebee, and Captain Marvel Jr.) and helped the Titans' past incarnations defeat the dark adult counterparts. After Infinite Crisis, the "Titans Tomorrow" timeline was altered by the deaths of Superboy and Bart Allen, with Duela Dent also being killed during Countdown. As such, in the "Titans Tomorrow... Today!" storyline, Bette remains Flamebird in the future, with Cassandra Cain being Batwoman. With the altered timeline, all the future heroes, even those who opposed the West Coast Titans, were unified in their fascistic endeavors to "save the world".
 She appears in the 20th issue of the Young Justice tie-in comic series, it is shown that Bette has spent the night with Dick Grayson/Nightwing.
 She appears in DC Bombshells.

In other media
 Bette appears in the Young Justice episode "Homefront" voiced by Alyson Stoner. She is a student at the Gotham Academy assigned to act as a liaison to Artemis Crock. In "Misplaced", Bette appears to be reading to young children with fellow school member Barbara Gordon/Batgirl.
 A version of Bette Kane, named Mary Elizabeth Hamilton, appears in Batwoman, portrayed by Nicole Kang. This version is Kate Kane's step-sister.

References

External links
 Batgirls of Gotham Profile
 Canarynoir Profile
 Flamebird Bio
 Flamebird Bio II
 The Unofficial Bat-Girl Biography
 The Unofficial Flamebird Biography

Batman characters
Characters created by Bill Finger
Characters created by Bob Kane
Characters created by George Pérez
Characters created by Sheldon Moldoff
DC Comics sidekicks
Comics characters introduced in 1961
Comics characters introduced in 1989
DC Comics martial artists
DC Comics female superheroes
Fictional American Jews
Fictional cadets
Fictional characters from Los Angeles
Fictional gymnasts
Fictional Jewish women
Fictional women soldiers and warriors
Fictional tennis players
Batgirl
Flamebird